Hattstedt (Danish: Hatsted, North Frisian: Haatst) is a municipality in the district of Nordfriesland, in Schleswig-Holstein, Germany. It is situated near the North Sea coast, approx. 6 km northwest of Husum.  Located on the edge of the village is the Mikkelberg-Kunst-und-Cricket Center, a cricket ground which has in the past held neutral Women's One Day Internationals between Denmark Women and the Netherlands Women.

Hattstedt is part of the Amt ("collective municipality") Nordsee-Treene. Hattstedt was the home of the last two speakers of Southern Goesharde Frisian until it became extinct with their deaths in 1980 and 1981.

References

Nordfriesland